Triclonella antidectis is a moth in the family Cosmopterigidae. It is found in Arizona and Mexico.

Adults have been recorded on wing from April to July.

References

Natural History Museum Lepidoptera generic names catalog

Cosmopteriginae
Moths of North America
Moths described in 1914